Thulani Ncube (born 21 September 1977) is a retired Zimbabwean football defender.

References

1977 births
Living people
Zimbabwean footballers
Zimbabwe international footballers
Highlanders F.C. players
Cape Town Spurs F.C. players
Cape Cod Crusaders players
Association football defenders
Zimbabwean expatriate footballers
Expatriate soccer players in South Africa
Zimbabwean expatriate sportspeople in South Africa
Expatriate soccer players in the United States
Zimbabwean expatriate sportspeople in the United States